Gemmula, common name the gem turrids, is a genus of sea snails, marine gastropod mollusks in the family Turridae, the turrids.

These snails have been recorded as fossils from the Paleocene to the Quaternary (from 66.043 to 0.012 Ma). Fossils have been found all over the world.

This genus is still regarded as paraphyletic and should be revised. A high number of undescribed species are estimated to belong to Gemmula. Since independent “Gemmula-like” lineages are distributed all over the turrid tree, a revision of Gemmula would entail again a complete revision of the family Turridae. 

They are venomous with disulfide-rich polypeptides in their venom ducts.
These bioactive peptides are likely to become a resource for novel pharmacologically active compounds

Habitat and feeding habits
The snails in this genus occur mostly in deeper tropical waters at depths between 50 and 500m. Because of these deep habitats, little is known about their feeding habits.

Taxonomy
The Gemmula clade is more closely related to the clades Xenuroturris, Turris and Lophiotoma than to the other clades in the former subfamily Turrinae.

Description
The fusiform shell resembles Drillia, but with a thin and simple outer lip without an anterior sulcus, and the inner lip usually simple, hardly callous. The protoconch is polygyrate and axially costate. There are three or four embryonal whorls, the two upper ones smooth, upright, the others longitudinally ribbed. The sculpture is most emphasized in a spiral direction, often with a prominent beaded keel at or in front of the anal fasciole.The rather long siphonal canal is narrow and tapering, sometimes curved. The sinus is straight, more or less narrow and long, terminating in a nodulous peripheral keel that is gemmate throughout. Type species : Pleurotoma gemmata Hinds, 1843   

The bead-row of the fasciole readily distinguishes this genus from related forms. Between the smooth protoconch and the adult whorls two or three whorls intervene with descrepant sculpture of fine arcuate longitudinal riblets. 

As expected from venomous species, these species have a toxoglosson radula (formula 1 + 0 +1 + 0 + 1) with a central tooth that characterizes this genus.

Species
The genus Gemmula is the largest genus in the former subfamily Turrinae. Species within the genus Gemmula include:

 Gemmula albina (Lamarck, 1822)
 Gemmula alwyni Kilburn, 2005
 Gemmula amabilis (Weinkauff, 1875)
 Gemmula ambara Olivera et al., 2008
 † Gemmula antedenticulata Lozouet, 2017 
 † Gemmula bearrizensis Pacaud, 2021 
 † Gemmula bimarginata (Suter, 1917) 
 † Gemmula birmanica Vredenburg, 1921
 † Gemmula brevirostris Lozouet, 2017
 Gemmula championi Kilburn, 1983
 Gemmula chinoi Stahlschmidt, Poppe & Tagaro, 2018
 † Gemmula clifdenensis Powell, 1942 
 Gemmula closterion Sysoev, 1997
 Gemmula concinna (Dunker, 1871)
 Gemmula congener (Smith E. A., 1894)
 Gemmula contrasta Stahlschmidt, Poppe & Tagaro, 2018
 Gemmula cosmoi (Sykes, 1930)
 Gemmula damperierana Powell, 1964
 † Gemmula denticula (Basterot, 1825) 
 Gemmula diomedea Powell, 1964
 † Gemmula disjuncta Laws, 1936 
 Gemmula ducalis (Thiele, 1925)
 † Gemmula duplex (Suter, 1917) 
 Gemmula fenestrata Kosuge, 1990
 Gemmula flata Baoquan Li & Xinzheng Li, 2008
 † Gemmula funiculosa Lozouet, 2017 
 † Gemmula garviei Tracey & Craig, 2019 
 Gemmula gemmulina (Martens, 1902)
 Gemmula gilchristi (Sowerby III, 1902)
 Gemmula graeffei (Weinkauff, 1875)
 Gemmula grandigyrata Baoquan Li & Xinzheng Li, 2008
 Gemmula granosus (Helbling, 1779)
 Gemmula hastula (Reeve, 1843)
 Gemmula hawleyi (Iredale, 1931)
 Gemmula hindsiana Berry, 1958
 Gemmula hombroni Hedley, 1922
 Gemmula husamaru (Nomura, 1940)
 Gemmula interpolata Powell, 1967
 † Gemmula kaiparaensis (P. Marshall, 1918) 
 Gemmula kieneri (Doumet, 1840)
 † Gemmula lawsi Powell, 1942 
 Gemmula lisajoni Olivera, 1999
 † Gemmula longwoodensis Powell, 1942 
 Gemmula lordhoweensis Kantor & Sysoev, 1991
 Gemmula lululimi Olivera, 1999
 † Gemmula machapoorensis C.J. Maury, 1925  
 † Gemmula margaritata (P. Marshall, 1919) 
 Gemmula martini (Tesch, 1915)
 Gemmula monilifera (Pease, 1860)
 Gemmula murrayi Powell, 1964
 Gemmula mystica Simone, 2005
 † Gemmula obesa Lozouet, 2017 
 Gemmula oliverai Stahlschmidt, Poppe & Tagaro, 2018
 † Gemmula orba Marwick, 1931 
 † Gemmula ornata (P. Marshall, 1918) 
 † Gemmula osca Pacaud, 2021 
 † Gemmula parkinsonii (Sandberger, 1860)
 † Gemmula peraspera Marwick, 1931 
 † Gemmula peyrerensis (Peyrot, 1931) 
 † Gemmula polita (P. Marshall, 1919) 
 Gemmula pseudogranosa (Nomura, 1940)
 Gemmula pseudomonilifera Powell, 1967
 Gemmula pseudostupa Y.-P. Cheng & C.-Y. Lee, 2011
 Gemmula rarimaculata Kuroda, Habe & Oyama, 1971
 † Gemmula reticulata (P. Marshall, 1919) 
 Gemmula rosario Shikama, 1977
 Gemmula rotata (Brocchi, 1814) 
 † Gemmula samueli (Tenison Woods, 1879)
 † Gemmula sculpturata Harzhauser, Raven & Landau, 2018 
 Gemmula sibogae (Schepman, 1913)
 Gemmula sibukoensis Powell, 1964
 Gemmula sikatunai Olivera, 2004
 Gemmula sogodensis Olivera, 2004
 Gemmula speciosa (Reeve, 1842)
 Gemmula stupa Lee, 2001
 Gemmula subfenestrata Kosuge, 1990
 † Gemmula tuckeri Tracey & Craig, 2019 
 Gemmula vagata (Smith E. A., 1895)
 † Gemmula waihaoensis Finlay, 1924 
 Gemmula webberae Kilburn, 1975
 Gemmula westaustralis Kosuge, 1990

Species brought into synonymy
 Gemmula aethiopica (Thiele, 1925): synonym of Cryptogemma aethiopica (Thiele, 1925)
 Gemmula bisinuata (Martens, 1901): synonym of Cryptogemma praesignis (E. A. Smith, 1895)
 Gemmula luzonica (Powell, 1964): synonym of Cryptogemma aethiopica (Thiele, 1925)
 Gemmula microscelida (Dall, 1895): synonym of Cryptogemma praesignis (E. A. Smith, 1895)
 Gemmula periscelida (Dall, 1889): synonym of Cryptogemma periscelida (Dall, 1889)
 Gemmula praesignis (Smith E. A., 1895): synonym of Cryptogemma praesignis (E. A. Smith, 1895)
 Gemmula rotatilis (Martens, 1902): synonym of Cryptogemma praesignis (E. A. Smith, 1895)
 Gemmula teschi (Powell, 1964): synonym of Cryptogemma timorensis (Tesch, 1915)
 Gemmula tessellata Powell, 1967: synonym of Cryptogemma tessellata (Powell, 1967)
 Gemmula thielei Finlay H. J., 1930: synonym of Cryptogemma aethiopica (Thiele, 1925)
 Gemmula truncata (Schepman, 1913): synonym of Cryptogemma phymatias (R. B. Watson, 1886)
 Gemmula unedo (Kiener, 1840): synonym of Unedogemmula unedo (Kiener, 1839)
 Gemmula unilineata Powell, 1967: synonym of Cryptogemma unilineata (Powell, 1967)
 Gemmula vicella Dall, 1908 accepted as Gymnobela vicella (Dall, 1908) (original combination)

References

 Powell, A.W.B. 1964. The Family Turridae in the Indo-Pacific. Part 1. The Subfamily Turrinae. Indo-Pacific Mollusca 1: 227-346
 Kilburn, R.N. (1983) Turridae (Mollusca: Gastropoda) of southern Africa and Mozambique. Part 1. Subfamily Turrinae. Annals of the Natal Museum, 25, 549–585.

External links
 Weinkauff H.C. (1875). Ueber eine kritische Gruppe des Genus Pleurotoma Lam. sensu stricto. Jahrbücher der Deutschen Malakozoologischen Gesellschaft. 2: 285-292, pl. 9
  Tucker, J.K. 2004 Catalog of recent and fossil turrids (Mollusca: Gastropoda). Zootaxa 682:1-1295.
 Worldwide Mollusc Species Data Base: Turridae
 BAOQUAN LI, XINZHENG LI, Report on the turrid genera Gemmula, Lophiotoma and Ptychosyrinx (Gastropoda: Turridae: Turrinae) from the China seas; Zootaxa Vol 1778, No 1 

 
Turridae
Extant Danian first appearances